Pharyngeal plexus can refer to:
 Pharyngeal plexus of vagus nerve – a network of pharyngeal nerves
 Pharyngeal plexus (venous) – a network of pharyngeal veins